The Pacific Coast Soccer League is an amateur soccer league, currently featuring teams from British Columbia. In the past clubs from Washington and Oregon have competed.

PCSL is considered  to be British Columbia's premier summer league. The league winners are not eligible for any higher cup competitions; however, most players participate in a winter league, such as the VMSL, VISL or FVSL, where teams do participate in BC Provincial Cup qualification. The league has a short, 2.5-month summer season. The league is considered to be a 4th tier competition next to USL League 2. The PCSL comprises elite football players, including ex-pros from Europe and North America, or NCAA or U Sports players and others looking to become professional footballers, or maintain fitness. Several clubs are directly affiliated and managed by local university soccer programs looking to keep their players in form and build team chemistry over the off-season.

The league fielded both men's and women's premier and reserve leagues with varying numbers of teams until 2014 when the league was reduced to one men's division. The current PCSL was reconstituted thereafter as a separate entity in 1995. Since 1989, the highest ranking PCSL Canadian team plays for the John F. Kennedy Cup against the Oregon Adult Soccer Association champion and the Washington State Adult Soccer Association champion.

As of 2017, the PCSL no longer operates a men's reserve division, or any women's divisions. After a four-year hiatus, John F. Kennedy Cup matches were announced to resume in 2018, with two British Columbia teams facing off against teams from Oregon.

Teams

Men's Premier 
Following teams are listed with the league for the 2022 season.

Champions

Men – The George Cambridge Memorial League Cup

 1981 Croatia AFC
 1982 Vancouver Whitecaps "B"
 1983 Croatia FC
 1984 New Westminster QPR
 1985 Croatia SC
 1986 Croatia SC
 1987 Croatia SC
 1988 ICSF Columbus
 1989 ICSF Columbus
 1990 Croatia SC
 1991 Croatia SC
 1992 WSSA Selects
 1993 Croatia SC
 1994 UBC Alumni

 1995 Victoria United
 1996 Seattle Hibernian and Caledonian Saints
 1997 Okanagan Challenge
 1998 Okanagan Challenge
 1999 Seattle Hibernian and Caledonian Saints
 2000 Seattle Hibernian and Caledonian Saints
 2001 Seattle Hibernian and Caledonian Saints
 2002 Victoria United
 2003 New Westminster Khalsa Sporting
 2004 Victoria United
 2005 Victoria United
 2006 Whitecaps FC Reserves
 2007 Victoria United
 2008 Victoria United

 2009 Okanagan Challenge
 2010 Vancouver Thunderbirds
 2011 Vancouver Thunderbirds
 2012 Vancouver Thunderbirds
 2013 Khalsa Sporting Club
 2014 Khalsa Sporting Club
 2015 Vancouver United FC
 2016 Vancouver Thunderbirds
 2017 Vancouver United FC
 2018 Khalsa Sporting Club
 2019 Victoria Highlander Reserves
 2022 Okanagan FC

Reserve Men

 2006 Victoria United
 2007 Norvan SC
 2008 Victoria United

 2009 Okanagan Whitecaps FC
 2010 Vancouver FC
 2011 Coquitlam Metro-Ford SC

 2012 Kamloops Heat
 2013 Abbotsford Metro-Ford Mariners
 2014 Mid Isle Highlanders

Women – The Jacques Moon Memorial League Cup

 1999 Vancouver Explorers
 2000 Portland Rain
 2001 Seattle Hibernian and Caledonian Saints
 2002 Seattle Hibernian and Caledonian Saints
 2003 Seattle Hibernian and Caledonian Saints
 2004 Seattle Hibernian and Caledonian Saints

 2005 Victoria Stars
 2006 Whitecaps Reserves
 2007 Whitecaps Reserves
 2008 Victoria Stars
 2009 Fraser Valley Action

 2010 Whitecaps Prospects
 2011 Vancouver Thunderbirds
 2012 Fraser Valley Action
 2013 Vancouver Whitecaps FC
 2014 Peninsula Co-op Highlanders

Reserve Women – The Len McAdams League Cup

 2006 North Shore Eagles Stars
 2007 Penticton Pinnacles
 2008 Tri-Cities Xtreme

 2009 Kamloops Heat
 2010 Fraser Valley Action
 2011 Kamloops Heat

 2012 West Vancouver FC
 2013 TSS Academy Black
 2014 Peninsula Co-op Highlanders FC

Challenge Cup winners
The Challenge Cup is with the top four teams, or the host team and the top three, competing in a straight knockout tournament seeded by league standings.

Men – The Sheila Anderson Memorial (Challenge) Cup

1995 Victoria United
1996 Victoria United
1997 Okanagan Challenge
1998 Victoria United
1999 Seattle Hibernian and Caledonian Saints
2000 New Westminster Sporting Khalsa 
2001 Surrey United
2002 New Westminster Sporting Khalsa 
2003 New Westminster Sporting Khalsa

2004 Victoria United
2005 New Westminster Sporting Khalsa 
2006 Victoria United
2007 Victoria United
2008 Victoria United
2009 Okanagan Challenge
2010 Vancouver Thunderbirds
2011 Okanagan Challenge

2012 Vancouver Thunderbirds
2013 Vancouver Thunderbirds
2014 Khalsa Sporting Club
2015 Khalsa Sporting Club
2016 Vancouver Thunderbirds
2017 Vancouver United FC
2018 Khalsa Sporting Club
2022 Port Moody Soccer Club

Women – The Dave Fryatt Challenge Cup

2001 Seattle Hibernian and Caledonian Saints
2002 Surrey United
2003 Tri-Cities Xtreme
2004 Tri-Cities Xtreme
2005 Seattle Hibernian and Caledonian Saints

2006 Whitecaps Women Reserves
2007 FC Xtreme
2008 Victoria Stars
2009 Whitecaps Prospects

2011 Vancouver Thunderbirds
2012 Fraser Valley Action
2013 Vancouver Whitecaps FC
2014 Peninsula Co-op Highlanders

Reserve Men

2014 Victoria Highlanders
2013 Penticton Pinnacles
2012 Victoria United

2011 Okanagan FC
2010 Vancouver FC
2009 Okanagan WFC

2008 Chilliwack FC Royal Racing
2007 Fraser Valley Action
2006 Victoria United

Reserve Women – Bill Gillespie Challenge Cup

2008 Tri-Cities Xtreme
2009 Penticton Pinnacles
2010 TSS Academy

2011 Fraser Valley Action
2012 Kelowna United

2013 Penticton Pinnacles
2014 Penticton Pinnacles

Former men's PCSL teams

Modern era
 86ers Reserves (1995–1996)
 Abbotsford Athletes in Action (1995–2001)
 Abbotsford Magnuson-Ford SC (2014–2015)
 ASA Devils (2018)
 Athletic Club of BC (2010)
 Bellingham Marlins (1998–1999)
 Columbus Clan F.C. (2005)
 Coquitlam Metro-Ford SC (2012–2014)
 EDC Burnaby (2013–2014)
 Fiji Saints (1995)
 FK Pacific (2006–2007)
 Fraser Valley Action (2002–2009)
 Ismaili (1995)
 Kamloops City Blaze (2004–2005)
 Kamloops Excel (2010–2011)
 Kamloops Heat (1995–1999, 2013–2016)
 Langley Athletic (2012)
 Mid-Isle Highlanders FC (2011)
 Okanagan Challenge (1995–2012)
 Peace Arch United (2007–2008)
 Penticton Pinnacles (1997–2006)
 PoCo City FC (2012)
 Port Moody SC (2017)
 PSSA Rapids (2001–2008)
 Richmond Clan (2004)
 Seattle Hibernian Saints (1995–2006)
 Seattle Wolves (2008)
 Surrey Eagles (2014)
 Surrey United (1999–2009, 2011)
 Team BC (2001–2003)
 UBC Alumni (1995)
 Vancouver Explorers (1998–2002)
 Vancouver Thunderbirds (2010–2017)
 Vancouver United FC (2016–2018)
 Victoria United (1995–2014)
 Whitecaps FC Reserves (2005–2006)
 Whitecaps FC Prospects (2008–2009)

Clubs timeline

Former women's PCSL teams

 Abbotsford Athletes in Action (1999–2001)
 Bellingham Marlins (1999)
 Hibernian & Caledonian (1999–2005)
 Kamloops City (2005)
 Kamloops UCC Alumni (1999–2003)
 Kelowna United (2008)
 Okanagan Challenge (1999–2000, 2004)
 Okanagan Predators (2002–2003)
 Portland Rain (2000–2003)
 PSSA Rapids (2007–2008)
 Semiahmoo SC (2008–2010)
 Skagit Valley (2000)
 Sportstown TSS (2005)
 Surrey United (2001–2009)
 Tacoma Pride (2000–2001)
 Team BC (2001–2003)
 Vancouver Explorers (1999–2000)
 Vancouver Thunderbirds (2006)

External links
 
https://web.archive.org/web/20131203002107/http://www.bcsoccerweb.com/articles-features/pcsl.htm
http://www.canadiansoccerhistory.com/BC/Pacific%20Coast%20Soccer%20League.html

References

 
Soccer in British Columbia
Soccer in Oregon
Soccer in Washington (state)
Sports leagues in British Columbia
Sports leagues established in 1995
1995 establishments in British Columbia
Soccer leagues in British Columbia